Gollijeh or Golijeh or Galijeh may refer to:
 Golijeh, Ardabil
 Golijeh, East Azerbaijan
 Galijeh, Isfahan
 Golijeh, West Azerbaijan
 Gollijeh, Zanjan
 Golijeh, Ijrud, Zanjan Province
 Gollijeh-ye Olya, Zanjan Province
 Gollijeh-ye Sofla, Zanjan Province